Marshall's horseshoe bat (Rhinolophus marshalli) is a species of bat in the family Rhinolophidae. It is found in Laos, Malaysia, Thailand, and Vietnam.

References

Rhinolophidae
Mammals described in 1973
Taxonomy articles created by Polbot
Bats of Southeast Asia